was a railway station on the Iwaizumi Line in Miyako, Japan, operated by East Japan Railway Company (JR East).

Lines
Nakasato Station was a station on the Iwaizumi Line, and was located 7.2 rail kilometers from the opposing terminus of the line at Moichi Station.

Station layout
Nakasato Station had a single side platform serving traffic in both directions. There was no station building. The station was unattended.

History
Nakasato Station opened on 1 October 1966. The station was absorbed into the JR East network upon the privatization of the Japanese National Railways (JNR) on 1 April 1987.  The operation of the Iwaizumi Line was suspended from July 2010 and the line was officially closed on 1 April 2014.

Surrounding area
Kariya River

References

Railway stations in Japan opened in 1966
Railway stations in Iwate Prefecture
Iwaizumi Line
Defunct railway stations in Japan
Railway stations closed in 2014